Richard Biggins (born 9 September 1967) is an Australian alpine skier. He competed in three events at the 1988 Winter Olympics.

References

External links
 

1967 births
Living people
Australian male alpine skiers
Olympic alpine skiers of Australia
Alpine skiers at the 1988 Winter Olympics
Skiers from Melbourne